The Continental Mill Housing buildings are a pair of historic mill worker housing blocks at 66-82 Oxford Street in Lewiston, Maine.  The Greek Revival/Italianate housing units were built in 1866, and are all that remain of a large number of similar buildings that once lined Oxford Street.  These two buildings were listed the National Register of Historic Places in 1979.

Description and history
The Continental Mill Housing blocks are located on the east side of Oxford Street on the west side of central Lewiston, facing the former Continental Mill complex, which lies between them and the Androscoggin River.  The two buildings are nearly identical four-story brick structures, with shallow-pitch hip roofs with bracketed cornice, interior end chimneys, and windows with granite lintels and sills.  The south building differs from the north one slightly, with a wooden cupola set near the front, and a colonnaded wooden porch on its north side.  Each block is ten bays wide and six deep, with a pair of recessed entries.

The site of Continental Mill originally had a small wooden mill, built in 1858, when it was purchased in 1866 by the Continental Company.  It replaced this modest structure with a much larger complex, and required housing to accommodate the large influx of workers.  To this end it built a series of these tenement houses across the canal and street from the mill, a practice typical of other mill owners in the area.  At that time, the property fronted the canal, with a lawn and trees presenting a dignified atmosphere.  These buildings were designed by Amos D. Lockwood and supervised by Albert H. Kelsey, agent of the company.

See also
National Register of Historic Places listings in Androscoggin County, Maine

References

Houses on the National Register of Historic Places in Maine
Buildings and structures in Lewiston, Maine
Houses in Lewiston, Maine
Houses completed in 1866
Apartment buildings in Maine
1866 establishments in Maine
National Register of Historic Places in Lewiston, Maine